Jocelyn Castillo Suárez (born 20 May 1991, Barquisimeto) is a Venezuelan diver. She competed in the 3 m springboard at the 2012 Summer Olympics.

References 

1991 births
Living people
Divers at the 2012 Summer Olympics
Olympic divers of Venezuela
Venezuelan female divers
Sportspeople from Barquisimeto
21st-century Venezuelan women